Morino is both a Japanese and Italian surname. Notable people with the surname include:

 Hiroaki Morino (born 1934), Japanese potter
 Jone Morino (1896–1978), Italian film actress
 Nobuhiko Morino, Japanese film composer
 Miyako Morino (born 1989), Japanese wrestler
 Yōsei Morino,  Japanese animation director

See also
Mourinho, Portuguese equivalent
Mouriño, Spanish equivalent

Italian-language surnames
Japanese-language surnames